Jean-Rodolphe Perronet (27 October 1708 – 27 February 1794) was a French architect and structural engineer, known for his many stone arch bridges. His best known work is the Pont de la Concorde (1787).

Early life
Perronet was born in Suresnes, a suburb of Paris, the son of a Swiss Guardsman. At age 17 he entered the architectural practice of Jean Beausire, "first architect" to the city of Paris, as an apprentice. He was put in charge of the design and construction of Paris's grand sewer, embankment works and the maintenance of the banlieue's roads. In 1735, he was named sous-ingénieur (under-engineer) to Alençon and in 1736 entered the Corps des ponts et chaussées. In 1737, he became sous-ingénieur, then engineer to the généralité of Alençon.

Career

In 1747, Perronet was named director of the Bureau des dessinateurs du Roi (Royal office of designers), which had also just put Daniel-Charles Trudaine in charge of producing maps and plans for the kingdom. This first École des ponts et chaussées was based in the hôtel Libéral Bruant in Paris. Perronet was given the task of training bridge and road engineers and of overseeing their work in the généralités in which they worked. The Bureau became the Bureau des élèves des ponts et chaussées, then in 1775 was renamed the École des ponts et chaussées. Its organiser, inspiration and teacher, Perronet was a true spiritual father to his students and used a new teaching method which seems very contemporary to modern eyes. During this time he became friends with the Swiss bridge-builder Charles Labelye.

He was named premier ingénieur du roi in 1763 and became a member of the associate of the Académie des sciences in 1765. Besides his bridges, between 1747 and 1791, 2500 km of roads were created or repaired under his direction. He also contributed the article Pompe à feu (fire-engine) to the Encyclopédie ou Dictionnaire raisonné des sciences, des arts et des métiers.

In 1772, Perronet was elected a foreign member of the Royal Swedish Academy of Sciences.  He died in Paris, aged 85. He was elected a Fellow of the Royal Society in 1788.

Death and legacy
He died on 27 February 1794 in Paris, aged 85. The street next to the site of the École des ponts et chaussées (delimiting Paris's 6th and 7th arrondissements) is now named after him and a statue of him has been erected on the northeast corner of the Île de Puteaux, at the foot of the pont de Neuilly (whose first stone version, built in 1772 and surviving until 1942, was his work).

French sculptor Adrien Étienne Gaudez created a monumental statue of Perronet that is erected at the northeast end of Puteaux Island on the Seine River near Paris.

Works

 1750–1760 – Bridge at Orléans
 1757–1765 – Bridge at Mantes
 1758–1764 – Bridge at Trilport
 1765–1786 – Bridge at Château-Thierry
 1766–1769 – Pont Saint-Edne at Nogent
 1768–1774 – Bridge at Neuilly-sur-Seine
 1770–1771 – Pont Les Fontaines
 1774–1785 – Bridge at Sainte-Maxence sur l'Oise
 1775 – Bridge at Biais-Bicheret
 1776–1791 – Bridge at Nemours
 1776-         – Bridge at Mirepoix, Ariege
 1784–1787 – Bridge at Brunoy
 1786–1787 – Bridge at Rosoy
 1786–1791 – Pont Louis XVI, later renamed Pont de la Concorde, Paris

Sources
 Guy Coriono, 250 ans de l’École des Ponts en cent portraits, Paris, Presses de l’École nationale des Ponts et Chaussées, 1997, p. 37 and following.
 M. Guillot, "Un destin helvétique, Jean-Rodophe Perronet et sa famille suresnoise (1708–1794)" in Les gardes suisses et leurs familles au XVIIe et XVIIIe siècles en région parisienne, p. 108–116.
 Yvon Michel, "Jean-Rodolphe Perronet (1708–1794)" in Monuments Historiques, Paris, April–June 1987, nos 150–151, p. 81–86.
 Claude Vacant, Jean-Rodolphe Perronet (1708–1794). Premier inégénieur du Roi et directeur de l'École des ponts et chaussées, Paris, Presses de l'École Nationale des Ponts et Chaussées, 2006. 24 cm, 344 p., ill.

External links

 Biography (EPC)
 Biography (Structurae)
 Jean-Rodolphe Perronet : article Pompe à feu in the Encyclopédie ou Dictionnaire raisonné des sciences, des arts et des métiers
Britannica

1708 births
1794 deaths
People from Suresnes
18th-century French architects
French bridge engineers
Structural engineers
Members of the French Academy of Sciences
Members of the Royal Swedish Academy of Sciences
Members of the Académie royale d'architecture
Fellows of the Royal Society
Contributors to the Encyclopédie (1751–1772)
French male non-fiction writers
18th-century French male writers